Franz Schroedter (9 May 1897 – 14 November 1968) was a German art director.

Selected filmography

 The Black Count (1920)
 The Dance of Love and Happiness (1921)
 The New Paradise (1921)
 The Queen of Whitechapel  (1922)
 The Men of Frau Clarissa (1922)
 The Cigarette Countess (1922)
 The Shadows of That Night (1922)
 The Shadow of the Mosque (1923)
 The Woman from the Orient (1923)
 The Voice of the Heart (1924)
 Strong Winds (1924)
 The Heart of Lilian Thorland (1924)
 Chamber Music (1925)
 Tragedy (1925)
 The Adventures of Sybil Brent (1925)
 The Elegant Bunch (1925)
 The Doll of Luna Park (1925)
 The Morals of the Alley (1925)
 The Flower Girl of Potsdam Square (1925)
 Roses from the South (1926)
 The Last Horse Carriage in Berlin (1926)
 Only a Dancing Girl (1926)
 The Flames Lie (1926)
 When She Starts, Look Out (1926)
 The Trousers (1927)
 Nameless Woman (1927)
 Intoxicated Love (1927)
 U-9 Weddigen (1927)
 My Aunt, Your Aunt (1927)
 The Hunt for the Bride (1927)
 The Indiscreet Woman (1927)
 The Queen of Spades (1927)
 The Island of Forbidden Kisses (1927)
 Violantha (1928)
 Lotte (1928)
 The Weekend Bride (1928)
 The Most Beautiful Woman in Paris (1928)
 Latin Quarter (1929)
 The Night Belongs to Us (1929)
 Marriage in Trouble (1929)
 The Ship of Lost Souls (1929)
 The Mistress and her Servant (1929)
 Cyanide (1930)
 Fire in the Opera House (1930)
 The Widow's Ball (1930)
 Scandalous Eva (1930)
 Hans in Every Street (1930)
 Louise, Queen of Prussia (1931)
 Elisabeth of Austria (1931)
 Poor as a Church Mouse (1931)
 Victoria and Her Hussar (1931)
 The Soaring Maiden (1931)
 My Leopold (1931)
 24 Hours in the Life of a Woman (1931)
 The True Jacob (1931)
 Gitta Discovers Her Heart (1932)
 I Do Not Want to Know Who You Are (1932)
 Love at First Sight (1932)
 Countess Mariza (1932)
 This One or None (1932)
 The Emperor's Waltz (1933)
 The Hymn of Leuthen (1933)
 A Song Goes Round the World (1933)
 Homecoming to Happiness (1933)
 Ripening Youth (1933)
 The Grand Duke's Finances (1934)
 Trouble with Jolanthe (1934)
 Mother and Child (1934)
 Charley's Aunt (1934)
 I Was Jack Mortimer (1935)
 The Valley of Love (1935)
 The Dreamer (1936)
 When the Cock Crows (1936)
 The Abduction of the Sabine Women (1936)
 The Prisoner (1949)
 The Rabanser Case (1950)
 Taxi-Kitty (1950)
 The Lie (1950)
 Melody of Fate (1950)
 The Beautiful Galatea (1950)
 The Lost One (1951)
 The Sinner (1951)
 Professor Nachtfalter (1951)
 Miracles Still Happen (1951)
 Queen of the Arena (1952)

References

Bibliography
 Giesen, Rolf. Nazi Propaganda Films: A History and Filmography. McFarland, 2003.

External links

1897 births
1968 deaths
German art directors
Film people from Berlin